The Badoglio I government of Italy held office from 25 July 1943 until 24 April 1944, a total of 273 days, or 9 months and 3 days.

Government parties
The government was composed by the following parties:

Composition

References

Italian governments
1943 establishments in Italy
1944 disestablishments in Italy
Cabinets established in 1943
Cabinets disestablished in 1944